Naing Win Swe (1940–1995) was a prominent Burmese writer and poet.

He wrote some famous Burmese short stories and novels as revolutionist and patriot. After the failed 8888 Uprising he left Burma. He was killed in a jungle on the Thai Border in 1995 by the Burmese Army.

The legend is that, as he lay dead on the battleground his comrades picked wild flowers and covered his remains with the flowers before they retreated as they didn't have enough time to bury him.

Naing Win Swe's most famous book was "Ma Thein Shin Si Pote Pay Bar  (1971)" a fictionalized semi-autobiographical novel. The story is a tragic love story of a smuggler-girl and a train-ticket-inspector on the Taung Dwin Gyi - Kyaukpaaung shuttle-train in middle Burma in late 1960s at the height of military-Socialist repression during General Ne Win's long rein.

None of Naing Win Swe's novels have been published in English translation, but Naing Win Swe's poem "Willow Tree"  is featured in the Foreign Policy in Focus website of the Institute for Policy Studies.

References

External links
Mahuyar.pdf, Mahuyar.
Poem, Naing Win Swe's Poem.
Novel Review, Ma Thein Shin.

Conflicts in 1988
Burmese democracy activists
1941 births
1995 deaths